is a fashion and music event held on October 1, 2014, at Yoyogi National Gymnasium 1st Gymnasium in Tokyo, Japan. It was 10th anniversary event and held under the theme of "LOVE ME 10DER. LOVE ME TENDER." The main MC is Japanese comedian duo Oriental Radio.

Models 
These models were present:

Artists 
These artists performed:
 Alexandra Stan
 Nogizaka46
 May J.
 Mariya Nishiuchi
 DOBERMAN INFINITY
 Da-ice
 Kemio & Amigachu
 NU'EST
 YU-A

Brands 
These brands were present:

References

External links 
 

Fashion events in Japan
Japanese fashion
Japanese subcultures
2014 in Japan
2014 awards
Events in Tokyo
Annual events in Japan
Semiannual events